Lizy may refer to:

People
 Lizy John, Indian-American electrical engineer,
 Lizy Tagliani (born 1970), Argentinian actress, comedian, and presenter

Places
 Lizy, Aisne, France
 Lizy-sur-Ourcq, France